Sauter is a surname of German origin:

 Sauter

This surname is also part of the name of some institutions and terms:
  August Sauter KG - a German manufacturer of weighing equipment acquired by Mettler Instruments AG in 1971
 Sauter AG - Swiss based international group active in building automation business
 Sauter's brown frog - species of frog in the genus Rana endemic to Taiwan  
 Sauter-Finegan Orchestra - American swing jazz band
 Sauter mean diameter - average of particle size
 Sauter Piano Manufaktur - a German manufacturer of pianos

See also 
 Sautter